This is a list of National Basketball Association players whose last names begin with R.

The list also includes players from the American National Basketball League (NBL), the Basketball Association of America (BAA), and the original American Basketball Association (ABA). All of these leagues contributed to the formation of the present-day NBA.

Individuals who played in the NBL prior to its 1949 merger with the BAA are listed in italics, as they are not traditionally listed in the NBA's official player registers.

R

Ivan Rabb
Luther Rackley
Howie Rader
Len Rader
Mark Radford
Wayne Radford
Dino Rađa
Vladimir Radmanović
Aleksandar Radojević
Frank Radovich
Moe Radovich
Miroslav Raduljica
Ray Radziszewski
Jim Rae
Ray Ragelis
Sherwin Raiken
Stan Raiman
Ed Rains
Igor Rakočević
Kurt Rambis
Peter John Ramos
Cal Ramsey
Frank Ramsey
Jahmi'us Ramsey
Ray Ramsey
Mark Randall
Chasson Randle
Julius Randle
Anthony Randolph
Shavlik Randolph
Zach Randolph
Wally Rank
Kelvin Ransey
Sam Ranzino
Bobby Rascoe
Blair Rasmussen
Xavier Rathan-Mayes
George Ratkovicz
Ed Ratleff
Mike Ratliff
Theo Ratliff
Andy Rautins
Leo Rautins
Allan Ray
Clifford Ray
Don Ray
James Ray
Jim Ray
Jimmy Rayl
Craig Raymond
Connie Rea
Austin Reaves
Joe Reaves
Josh Reaves
Željko Rebrača
Eldridge Recasner
Michael Redd
Cam Reddish
Frank Reddout
JJ Redick
Marlon Redmond
Billy Reed
Davon Reed
Hub Reed
Justin Reed
Paul Reed
Ron Reed
Willie Reed
Willis Reed
Bill Reeves
Bryant Reeves
Khalid Reeves
Richie Regan
Bob Regh
Don Rehfeldt
Fred Rehm
Billy Reid
Don Reid
J. R. Reid
Jim Reid
Naz Reid
Robert Reid
Ryan Reid
Jared Reiner
Chick Reiser
Rube Reiswerg
Marty Reiter
Richard Rellford
Terrence Rencher
John Rennicke
Bob Rensberger
Efthimios Rentzias
Shawn Respert
Kevin Restani
Cameron Reynolds
George Reynolds
Jerry Reynolds
Kendall Rhine
Jared Rhoden
Gene Rhodes
Rodrick Rhodes
Del Rice
Glen Rice
Glen Rice Jr.
Tommy Rich
Chris Richard
Nick Richards
Clint Richardson
Jason Richardson
Jeremy Richardson
Josh Richardson
Malachi Richardson
Micheal Ray Richardson
Norman Richardson
Pooh Richardson
Quentin Richardson
Ocie Richie
Mitch Richmond
John Richter
Dick Ricketts
Isaiah Rider
Jackie Ridgle
Luke Ridnour
Bill Riebe
Mel Riebe
Bob Riedy
Jim Riffey 
Antoine Rigaudeau
Ted Rigg
Tom Riker
Bob Riley
Eric Riley
Pat Riley
Ron Riley
Grant Riller
Rich Rinaldi
Mike Riordan
Arnie Risen
Eddie Riska
Tex Ritter
Ramón Rivas
Austin Rivers
David Rivers
Doc Rivers
Jule Rivlin
Jerry Rizzo
Red Robbins
Lee Robbins
André Roberson
Anthony Roberson
Rick Roberson
Terrance Roberson
Anthony Roberts
Bill Roberts
Brian Roberts
Fred Roberts
Glen Roberts
Joe Roberts
Lawrence Roberts
Marv Roberts
Stanley Roberts
Wyman Roberts
Alvin Robertson
Oscar Robertson
Ryan Robertson
Tony Robertson
Rick Robey
Bernard Robinson
Chris Robinson
Cliff Robinson (b. 1960)
Clifford Robinson (b. 1966)
David Robinson
Devin Robinson
Duncan Robinson
Eddie Robinson
Flynn Robinson
Glenn Robinson
Glenn Robinson III
Jackie Robinson
Jamal Robinson
James Robinson
Jerome Robinson
Justin Robinson
Larry Robinson
Mitchell Robinson
Nate Robinson
Oliver Robinson
Orlando Robinson
Ronnie Robinson
Rumeal Robinson
Sam Robinson
Thomas Robinson
Truck Robinson
Wayne Robinson
Wil Robinson
Jeremiah Robinson-Earl
Bill Robinzine
Dave Robisch
Isaiah Roby
Red Rocha
John Roche
Gene Rock
Jack Rocker
David Roddy
Guy Rodgers
Dennis Rodman
Abel Rodrigues
Sergio Rodríguez
Lou Roe
Carlos Rogers
Harry Rogers
Johnny Rogers
Marshall Rogers
Rodney Rogers
Roy Rogers
Willie Rogers
Al Roges
Ken Rohloff
Kenny Rollins
Phil Rollins
Ryan Rollins
Tree Rollins
Lorenzo Romar
Rajon Rondo
Jerry Rook
Sean Rooks
Pat Rooney
Swede Roos
Derrick Rose
Jalen Rose
Malik Rose
Robert Rose
Petey Rosenberg
Lennie Rosenbluth
Hank Rosenstein
Dick Rosenthal
Gene Rosenthal
Quinton Ross
Terrence Ross
Carl Roth
Doug Roth
Scott Roth
Irv Rothenberg
Les Rothman
Mickey Rottner
Dan Roundfield
Giff Roux
Ron Rowan
Curtis Rowe
Jim Rowinski
Derrick Rowland
Brian Rowsom
Brandon Roy
Donald Royal
Reggie Royals
Bob Royer
Clifford Rozier
Terry Rozier
Ricky Rubio
Guy Rucker
Damjan Rudež
Delaney Rudd
John Rudd
Rex Rudicel
John Rudometkin
Michael Ruffin
Trevor Ruffin
Paul Ruffner
Clem Ruh
Joe Ruklick
Jeff Ruland
Bob Rule
Jerry Rullo
George Rung
Stefano Rusconi
Brandon Rush
Kareem Rush
Mal Rush
Bill Russell
Bryon Russell
Campy Russell
Cazzie Russell
D'Angelo Russell
Frank Russell
Pierre Russell
Rubin Russell
Walker Russell
Walker Russell Jr.
Lou Rutter
Matt Ryan

References
  NBA & ABA Players with Last Names Starting with R @ basketball-reference.com
 NBL Players with Last Names Starting with R @ basketball-reference.com

R